Darren Mickell (born August 3, 1970) is an American former college and professional football player who was a defensive end in the National Football League (NFL) for ten seasons during the 1990s and early 2000s.  Mickell played college football for the University of Florida, and thereafter, he played professionally for the Kansas City Chiefs, the New Orleans Saints, the San Diego Chargers and the Oakland Raiders of the NFL.

Early years 

Mickell was born in Miami, Florida in 1970.  He attended Miami Senior High School, and played high school football for the Miami Stingarees.

College career 

Mickell accepted an athletic scholarship to attend the University of Florida in Gainesville, Florida, where he played for coach Steve Spurrier's Florida Gators football teams in 1990 and 1991.  Mickell was a highly regarded recruit who was signed by the Gators' previous head coach, Galen Hall, but he did not qualify academically and was ineligible to play under the NCAA's Proposition 48 legislation during his freshman season in 1989.  Spurrier subsequently benched him for the first five games of the 1991 season for his failure to attend classes as required.  After his return to the playing field, Mickell was one of the defensive heroes in the Gators' 14–9 upset of the Florida State Seminoles in November 1991—widely regarded as one of the closest and hardest-fought games in the Florida-Florida State rivalry series.  Mickell lettered in 1990 and 1991, and left school a year early, after being suspended for the 1992 season for undisclosed violations of team rules.

Professional career 

In his eight NFL seasons, Mickell played in eighty-nine regular season games, started sixty-one of them, and recorded 178 tackles and eleven forced fumbles.

Life after football 

Mickell is the father of four children: eldest son Darren C. Mickell, Delesha Mickell, Darreon Mickell and Anyae Mickell.

See also 

 Florida Gators football, 1990–99
 List of Kansas City Chiefs players
 List of New Orleans Saints players

References

Bibliography 

 Carlson, Norm, University of Florida Football Vault: The History of the Florida Gators, Whitman Publishing, LLC, Atlanta, Georgia (2007).  .
 Golenbock, Peter, Go Gators!  An Oral History of Florida's Pursuit of Gridiron Glory, Legends Publishing, LLC, St. Petersburg, Florida (2002).  .
 Hairston, Jack, Tales from the Gator Swamp: A Collection of the Greatest Gator Stories Ever Told, Sports Publishing, LLC, Champaign, Illinois (2002).  .
 McCarthy, Kevin M.,  Fightin' Gators: A History of University of Florida Football, Arcadia Publishing, Mount Pleasant, South Carolina (2000).  .
 Nash, Noel, ed., The Gainesville Sun Presents The Greatest Moments in Florida Gators Football, Sports Publishing, Inc., Champaign, Illinois (1998).  .

1970 births
Living people
American football defensive ends
Florida Gators football players
Kansas City Chiefs players
New Orleans Saints players
Oakland Raiders players
Players of American football from Miami
San Diego Chargers players
Miami Senior High School alumni